This is a list of official U.S. state theaters:

See also
Lists of U.S. state insignia

References

States of the United States-related lists
United States state insignia